John Shilling (15 February 1832 – 22 July 1884) was a first lieutenant of the United States Army who was awarded the Medal of Honor for gallantry during the American Civil War. He was awarded the medal on 6 September 1864 for actions performed on 21 August 1864 during the Second Battle of the Weldon Railroad in Virginia.

Personal life 
Shilling was born in England on 15 February 1832. In 1853, he married Margaret Kirkbride and they had seven children. After her death (date unknown), he married Emma Massey on July 27, 1869, who lived until 1935. They had four children. He died of a brain tumor on 22 July 1884, in Wilmington, Delaware and is buried in Riverview Cemetery in Wilmington.

Military service 
Shilling enlisted in Felton, Delaware with H Company of the 3rd Delaware Infantry on 30 December 1861. Shortly after the Battle of Antietam (also known as the Battle of Sharpsburg) on September 17, 1862, Shilling became a first sergeant. On 21 August 1864, in a battle with Confederate General Johnson Hagood's forces, a Carolinian flag captured by Captain Dennis Daily was retaken by Hagood. Taking advantage of the confusion, Shilling ran forward and captured a South Carolinian flag, an action that won him the Medal of Honor. It is unknown when Shilling was promoted to second lieutenant, but he was promoted to first lieutenant on 2 October 1864.

Shilling's Medal of Honor citation reads:

Shilling was mustered out of the Army on 3 June 1865. His Medal of Honor is attributed to Delaware.

References

Further reading
 

1832 births
American Civil War recipients of the Medal of Honor
1884 deaths
English-born Medal of Honor recipients
United States Army Medal of Honor recipients
Deaths from brain cancer in the United States